Teles may refer to:
 Teles of Megara, (fl.  BC), Cynic philosopher and teacher
Teles (mythology)
 Antonio Teles (born 1982), Brazilian footballer
 Basílio Teles (1856–1923), Portuguese author
 Bruno Teles (born 1986), Brazilian footballer
 Leonor Teles (c.1350–c.1405), Portuguese queen 
 Vitali Teleš (born 1983), Estonian footballer
 Teles River, a river in Perm Krai, Russia
 TELES, a German company

See also 
 Tele (disambiguation)

Portuguese-language surnames